Henry Harbinson Sinclair (1858–1914) was a pioneer of the hydro-electric industry in the U.S. state of California.

Biography 
Henry Harbinson Sinclair was born in Brooklyn, New York on December 22, 1858. He was educated in public schools, went to sea from ages 15 to 18, and entered Cornell University, but left to work in the shipping business. He earned a degree in maritime law at Columbia.

He married Agnes Rowley in Brooklyn on January 4, 1882, and they had two children.

Henry Harbinson Sinclair died in Pasadena, California on September 1, 1914.

Pomona Water Powerplant  

The San Antonio Light and Power Company was the idea of the President of Pomona College, Dr. Cyrus Grandison Baldwin. Baldwin joined Henry Harbinson Sinclair in starting San Antonio Light and Power Company. A.W. Decker was hired to be the chief engineer of the project. Decker had been train in the use of AC power.  George Westinghouse's company, Westinghouse Electric Corporation built the high-voltage transformers need to increase the power plants voltage to 10,000 volts for the long-distance power lines that fed the city of Pomona 14 miles a way. The system was so successful that a 29-mile line was add to fed power to San Bernardino, California.  The San Antonio Light and Power Company's Pomona Water Powerplant is oldest AC power plant in California feeding electricity to the Pomona and the San Gabriel Valley, built in 1892. The Pomona Water Power Plant was designated a California Historic Landmark (No.514) on November 25, 1953. The Pomona Water Power Plant was built by the San Antonio Light and Power Company. The Pomona Water Power Plant is located near Mount Baldy Village, California in Los Angeles County on Camp Baldy Road, San Antonio Canyon.

References 

1858 births
1914 deaths
Columbia Law School alumni
Hydroelectric engineers